Mathematical formalism can mean:

Formalism (philosophy of mathematics), a general philosophical approach to mathematics
Formal logical systems, in mathematical logic, a particular system of formal logical reasoning